Jalaluddin bin Abu Jaafar  born 1 January 1975, commonly known as Jalal, is a Malaysian footballer who played for Pahang FA as a defender. He was the captain of the team.

Career
He began his professional football career with Pahang FA in 1997. Since then, he has helped Pahang FA to win the Malaysia Premier League in 1999, the Malaysia Super League in 2004 and the Malaysia FA Cup in 2006.

Apart from Pahang FA, he also played for Shahzan Muda FC, also based in Pahang, for two seasons. He was loaned back to Pahang in 2009 for 2009 Malaysia Cup campaign and permanently stay.

Though played for Pahang since 1997, he never won any Malaysia cup trophy. So the 2013 final seems impossible for him since Kelantan is the dominant force of Malaysia football then and Pahang finished second to them in a group stage. But it all went well for him when Matias Conti header is the only crack that separated these two teams and Pahang finally won the Malaysia Cup.

2014 is another successful year for Jalal when Pahang ended up their domestic campaign with FA cup & Malaysia Cup. Both are dramatic finals when they trailed by behind to finished as champion and secure upcoming AFC Cup 2015 campaign. Though Jalal didn't play regularly he still gave his best when fielded since he is the oldest player of the team and most experiences amongst them.

Personal life
Jalal is a father of two kids. He resides in Taman Guru, Kuantan. The reason why he was still fit for professional football until forty years old was because he had never suffered from any major injuries and had never gone through any major surgery. Therefore, he remained fit to play while other players of his generation had already hung up their boots by the time they reached their 30s.

In December 2015, he retired from professional football.

Honours

Club
Pahang FA
 Malaysia Cup:
 Winners (2): 2013, 2014
 FA Cup:
 Winners (2): 2006, 2014
 Division 1/ Premier 1/ Super League:
 Winners (2): 1999, 2004
 Malaysian Charity Shield
 Winner (1): 2014

References

1975 births
Living people
People from Pahang
Malaysian footballers
Association football defenders
Sri Pahang FC players
Shahzan Muda FC players
Malaysia Super League players